Axis is the second album released by Australian hip hop artist MC Pegz. It was released in 2005, 18 months after his debut album. This recording features appearances from other Australian MCs, including Hilltop Hoods, Hyjak N Torcha, and Debaser (Ethic and Sapient).

Track listing

All tracks written by Tirren Staaf and Leigh Ryan unless otherwise noted.
 "Intro" (Tirren Staaf) – 0:30
 "Chechen Gorilla" – 4:06
 "Back Then" (Tirren Staff, M Lambert) – 3:28
 "Cro-Magnon" (Tirren Staaf) – 3:03
 "This is for Life" (featuring Hilltop Hoods) (Tirren Staaf) – 3:56
 "What Would Happen?" – 4:15
 "Fuckin wid Pegz" – 3:45
 "Two Sides of the Map" (featuring Debaser) – 3:34
 "The Last Bushman" – 3:21
 "Blink of an Eye" – 3:11
 "Put the World on Hold" – 2:55
 "Mad Luv" (featuring Hyjak N Torcha) – 3:27
 "Living on Earth" – 2:43
 "Zenith" – 3:21

Credits
 Artwork  – Mexi 
 Mastered – Chris Chetland (Kog Mastering)
 Photography – Andrew Boyle 
 Producer – Plutonic Lab (tracks: 1 to 4, 6, 8 to 14) 
 Recorded By, Mixed By – Pegz (tracks: 1 to 4, 6, 8 to 14), Plutonic Lab (tracks: 1 to 4, 6, 8 to 14)

References

External links
 Australian Music Online interview with Pegz talking about "Axis"

Pegz albums
2005 albums
Obese Records albums